The Hollywood Sign is a 2001 comedy/suspense drama film directed by Sönke Wortmann and written by Leon de Winter. It stars Tom Berenger, Rod Steiger and Burt Reynolds as three washed-up actors risking their lives to make a comeback, as well as Jacqueline Kim.

Plot
When three great, has-been actors meet at the funeral of a legendary Hollywood agent, their alcoholic reunion leads them to visit the Hollywood Sign. There they find the body of a man – leading them to uncover an in-progress scam for stealing millions from a Las Vegas casino – which originated as a movie plot written by one of the actors' ex-girlfriends – who could not get her script produced. Desperate to make a comeback, the three risk their lives for production capital ... by writing themselves into the "script."

Cast
 Tom Berenger as Tom Greener
 Jacqueline Kim as Paula Carver
 Rod Steiger as Floyd Benson
 Burt Reynolds as Kage Mulligan
 Al Sapienza as Rodney
 Dominic Keating as Steve
 Eric Bruskotter as Muscle
 David Proval as Charlie
 Kay E. Kuter as Robbie Kant

References

External links
 
 

German comedy-drama films
Dutch comedy-drama films
2001 films
English-language Dutch films
English-language German films
Films directed by Sönke Wortmann
Films set in California
Films shot in California
Films shot in Nevada
Films shot in the Netherlands
2001 comedy-drama films
American comedy-drama films
Films based on Dutch novels
Films about actors
2001 comedy films
2001 drama films
2000s English-language films
2000s American films
2000s German films